is a former Japanese football player. She played for Japan national team.

Club career
Kimura was born in Kyoto Prefecture on July 30, 1971. After graduating from Osaka University of Health and Sport Sciences, she played for Speranza FC Takatsuki from 1994 to 2003.

National team career
On May 16, 1996, Kimura debuted for Japan national team against United States. She played at 1999 and 2001 AFC Championship. She played 21 games for Japan until 2001.

National team statistics

References

1971 births
Living people
Osaka University of Health and Sport Sciences alumni
Association football people from Kyoto Prefecture
Japanese women's footballers
Japan women's international footballers
Nadeshiko League players
Speranza Osaka-Takatsuki players
Women's association football defenders